Evan James (born 19 June 1990) is a Canadian soccer player who plays for Oakville Blue Devils as a forward.

Club career
James played 25 games for the Charlotte 49ers in 2011, and was a starter for 23 games. He totaled five goals and seven assists. In 2011, he was named to the All-Atlantic 10 First Team and the NSCAA All-Mid-Atlantic Region First Team. In 2008, he was named to the Atlantic 10 All-Rookie team.  James played club soccer for the Oakville SC and was part of the Oakville Blue Stars for 4 years prior to joining the Charlotte program. He won the U21 Ontario Cup with Oakville.

While in college, James appeared for USL PDL club Hamilton FC Rage in 2011, making eight appearances and scoring two goals.

James was selected 1st overall in the 2012 MLS Supplemental Draft and signed by the Montreal Impact on March 1, 2012 He was released by Montreal on November 2, 2012.

After his release he returned to the PDL to play with K–W United FC.

After the conclusion of the PDL season he signed with Astros Vasas of the Canadian Soccer League, where he recorded 5 goals.

In 2014, he went abroad to England to sign with Tonbridge Angels F.C. in the Conference South League. That season, he made four appearances, scoring one goal.

In 2014, James signed with Finnish Kakkonen side Kraft. He made six appearances that season, scoring two goals.

In 2015, he signed with BK Marienlyst in the Danish 2nd Division.

In June 2015, James returned to Canada and signed with League1 Ontario side Sigma FC. He scored a hat-trick on his debut on 4 June 2015.

In 2018, James played for League1 Ontario side Master's Futbol and made nine appearances that season.

In 2019, James signed with Oakville Blue Devils.

International career
James made his debut for the Canada U23 national team in 2012.

James made his senior team debut on January 26, 2013 in a friendly against Denmark as a second half sub for Dwayne De Rosario, the game ended as a 4–0 defeat.

Honours
University of North Carolina at Charlotte
Atlantic 10 Conference All Rookie Team: 2008

References

External links
 
 
 

1990 births
Living people
Association football forwards
Canadian soccer players
Soccer players from Mississauga
Black Canadian soccer players
Canadian sportspeople of Jamaican descent
Canadian expatriate soccer players
Expatriate soccer players in the United States
Canadian expatriate sportspeople in the United States
Expatriate footballers in England
Canadian expatriate sportspeople in England
Expatriate footballers in Finland
Canadian expatriate sportspeople in Finland
Expatriate men's footballers in Denmark
Canadian expatriate sportspeople in Denmark
Charlotte 49ers men's soccer players
K-W United FC players
BK Marienlyst players
CF Montréal draft picks
CF Montréal players
North York Astros players
Tonbridge Angels F.C. players
USL League Two players
Canadian Soccer League (1998–present) players
National League (English football) players
Kakkonen players
Danish 2nd Division players
League1 Ontario players
Canada men's under-23 international soccer players
Canada men's international soccer players
Blue Devils FC players
Master's FA players
Sigma FC players